= Paolo Faraboschi =

Paolo Faraboschi from Hewlett-Packard, Barcelona, Spain was named Fellow of the Institute of Electrical and Electronics Engineers (IEEE) in 2014 for contributions to embedded processor architecture and system-on-chip technology.
